Koray Şanlı (born 26 December 1989, in Mersin) is a Turkish football  defender. He last played at Batman Petrolspor.

Şanlı joined Beşiktaş at the age of 15, on amateur level, in 2005. Although he was added up to match squads multiple times in 2007–08 season, he never could make himself selected for starting line-up at senior level.

References

External links
 
 

1989 births
Living people
Turkish footballers
Beşiktaş J.K. footballers
Adanaspor footballers
Turkey youth international footballers
Yeni Malatyaspor footballers
Association football defenders